Central Election Commission (abbreviated CVK) is the commission responsible for the organising and conducting of elections in the Republic of Latvia. It is regulated by Latvian national law. It organises elections to the Saeima, the European Parliament, local councils as well as referendums. The CVK is an independent state-owned institution and consists of nine members serving four year terms: the chairperson plus seven of the members are elected by the Saeima, while the ninth member is chosen among the judges of the Supreme Court of Latvia.

The commission was established in its current form after on 8 December 1992 after Latvian independence from the Soviet Union. It was, however, originally formed on 20 July 1922 for the first Saeima elections later same year. Since March 2019, Kristīne Bērziņa has served as the commission's chairperson.

Commission chairs 
The commission has had five chairpersons:

Notes

References

External links 
 Official website (English)

Latvia
Elections in Latvia